The  Etowah River is a  waterway that rises northwest of Dahlonega, Georgia, north of Atlanta. On Matthew Carey's 1795 map the river was labeled "High Town River". On later maps, such as the 1839 Cass County map (Cass being the original name for Bartow County), it was referred to as "Hightower River", a name that was used in most early Cherokee records.

The large Amicalola Creek (which flows over Amicalola Falls) is a primary tributary near the beginning of the river. The Etowah then flows west-southwest through Canton, Georgia, and soon forms Lake Allatoona. From the dam at the lake, it passes Cartersville and the Etowah Indian Mounds archaeological site. It then flows to Rome, Georgia, where it meets the Oostanaula River and forms the Coosa River at their confluence.  The river is the northernmost portion of the Etowah-Coosa-Alabama-Mobile Waterway, stretching from the mountains of north Georgia to Mobile Bay in Alabama.

The Little River is the largest tributary of the Etowah, their confluence now flooded by Lake Allatoona.  Allatoona Creek is another major tributary, flowing north from Cobb County and forming the other major arm of the lake.

The U.S. Board on Geographic Names officially named the river in 1897.

The river is home to the Cherokee darter and Etowah darter, which are listed on the Endangered Species List.

Country singer-songwriter Jerry Reed made the Etowah the home of the wild, misunderstood swamp dweller Ko-Ko Joe in the 1971 song "Ko-Ko Joe". The fictional character, who is reviled by respectable people but apparently dies a hero while saving a child's life, is alternately known as the "Etowah River Swamp Rat" in the song. Reed, a native of Atlanta, took some liberties with Georgia geography in the song, including the non-existent "Appaloosa County" and "Ko-Ko Ridge" as part of the song narrative’s setting.

Tributaries 
Acworth Creek
Allatoona Creek
Amicalola River
Big Dry Creek
Boston Creek
Butler Creek
Cane Creek
Canton Creek
Clark Creek
Downing Creek
Dykes Creek
Euharlee Creek
Hall Creek
Hickory Log Creek
Illinois Creek
Kellogg Creek
Little Allatoona Creek
Little River
Long Swamp Creek
McKaskey Creek
Noonday Creek
Owl Creek
Petit Creek
Proctor Creek
Pumpkinvine Creek
Raccoon Creek
Rocky Creek
Rubes Creek
Shoal Creek
Sixes Creek
Settin Down Creek
Stamp Creek
Tanyard Creek
Two Run Creek

Places
Lumpkin County, Georgia
Dahlonega
Dawson County, Georgia
Dawsonville
Forsyth County, Georgia
Cherokee County, Georgia
Canton
Bartow County, Georgia
Cartersville
Floyd County, Georgia
Rome

References

External links

Rivers of Georgia (U.S. state)
Rivers of Lumpkin County, Georgia
Rivers of Dawson County, Georgia
Rivers of Forsyth County, Georgia
Rivers of Cherokee County, Georgia
Rivers of Bartow County, Georgia
Rivers of Floyd County, Georgia
ACT River Basin